Shanastaq or Shanestaq or Shanstaq may refer to:

Shanastaq-e Olya
Shanastaq-e Sofla